Diplogrammus is a genus of dragonets.

Species
There are currently 8 recognized species in this genus:
 Diplogrammus goramensis (Bleeker, 1858) (Goram dragonet)
 Diplogrammus gruveli J. L. B. Smith, 1963 (Gruvel's dragonet)
 Diplogrammus infulatus J. L. B. Smith, 1963 (Indian Ocean fold dragonet)
 Diplogrammus pauciradiatus (Gill, 1865) (Spotted dragonet) 
 Diplogrammus paucispinis R. Fricke & Bogorodsky, 2014 (Saudi Arabian dragonet) 
 Diplogrammus pygmaeus R. Fricke, 1981 (Pygmy dragonet)
 Diplogrammus randalli R. Fricke, 1983 (Randall's fold dragonet)
 Diplogrammus xenicus (D. S. Jordan & W. F. Thompson, 1914) (Japanese fold dragonet)

D. pauciradiatus is sometimes placed in its own monotypic genus Chalinops.

References

Callionymidae
Marine fish genera
Taxa named by Theodore Gill